Betul may refer to:

Places
 Betul district, India
 Betul (Lok Sabha constituency), one of the 29 Lok Sabha constituencies in Madhya Pradesh
 Betul (Vidhan Sabha constituency)
 Betul, Goa, India
 Betul, Madhya Pradesh, India

See also
 Betül, a Turkish given name for women
 Sal River (disambiguation)